HMS Pursuer is an  P2000 patrol and training vessel of the Royal Navy.

History
Pursuer was built at Vosper Thorneycroft and commissioned in 1988. The famous greyhound Ballyregan Bob was guest of honour at her launch, a unique recognition of the greyhound on her badge. Prior to 2003 Pursuer was the training vessel of Sussex University Royal Naval Unit (SUSURNU).

The Royal Navy Cyprus Squadron was created in February 2003 to protect ships around the Sovereign Base Areas in Cyprus, a vital staging post in the British logistic chain to Iraq. Both were fitted with Kevlar armour and three FN MAG general purpose machine guns, with an extra crew member (compared to the P2000s assigned to URNU duties) employed as a Gunners Yeoman. In 2007 she helped rescue the fishing vessel Seafighter3 which had run aground on Cape Zevgari.

The Cyprus Squadron was disbanded in 2010 and Pursuer was assigned to the Faslane Patrol Boat Squadron, protecting the ballistic missile submarines at HMNB Clyde. In September 2012 her force protection duties were taken over by the more modern  and she was reassigned to Glasgow URNU.

From 2020 to 2022 she was posted to Gibraltar Squadron. In July 2020, Pursuer escorted the Spanish patrol boat Serviola out of Gibraltar's territorial waters. The Spanish vessel had remained in British waters for roughly 45 minutes, and the intrusion drew criticism from British maritime officials following the incident.

Notes

References

External links

 

Archer-class patrol vessels